Roger Kent Hansson (born July 13, 1967 in Helsingborg, Sweden) is a Swedish ice hockey player. He won a gold medal at the 1994 Winter Olympics, won the Swedish championships twice and became runner-up in the German championships with the Kassel Huskies in 1997.

Career statistics

Regular season and playoffs

International

References

External links
bio

1967 births
Living people
Ice hockey players at the 1994 Winter Olympics
Medalists at the 1994 Winter Olympics
Olympic gold medalists for Sweden
Olympic medalists in ice hockey
Sportspeople from Helsingborg
Swedish expatriate ice hockey players in Germany
Swedish ice hockey forwards
People from Ängelholm Municipality
Vancouver Canucks draft picks